Hestina nicevillei, the scarce siren, is a species of siren butterfly (Apaturinae) found in the western Himalayas, Himachal Pradesh, Nepal and to China and Vietnam.

Subspecies
H. n. nicevillei (western Himalayas, Himachal Pradesh, Nepal)
H. n. jermyni (Druce, 1911) (central Himalayas)
H. n. ouvradi Riley, 1939 (China (Yunnan, south-east Tibet))
H. n. nigra Morishita, 1997 (central Nepal)
H. n. magna Omoto & Funahashi, 2004 (northern Vietnam)

References

Apaturinae
Butterflies described in 1895